Rodrigo Defendi (born 16 June 1986) is a Brazilian footballer who plays as a central defender.

Club career
Defendi was first spotted as a 16-year-old by the then Tottenham Hotspur Director of Sport Frank Arnesen. He was the first player signed under the Frank Arnesen and Jacques Santini era at Spurs from Cruzeiro for a fee of £600,000 on July 3, 2004, although he had to wait for his passport to arrive in August for the deal to be officially completed. He failed to make a first team appearance for Tottenham but featured in a number of reserve team matches.

He was deemed surplus to requirements by Tottenham Hotspur manager Martin Jol, as he was first allowed to travel back to Brazil to seek a contract with a new club which proved unsuccessful, before he was farmed out on loan to Udinese Calcio in January 2006. He made two league appearances before leaving for A.S. Roma in August 2006, again on loan. He made an appearance in the Champions League and in the Coppa Italia for the capital club, but didn't manage to play a league game in Serie A.

Defendi returned to Tottenham Hotspur from Roma after his loan period ended. On August 9, 2007 Tottenham announced his departure to the Italian Serie B club Avellino on a permanent transfer.

Defendi became a free agent after the bankruptcy of Avellino and returned to Brazil. He joined the Palmeiras reserves in March 2010.

On 18 May 2011, Defendi signed a contract with Portuguese Primeira Liga side Vitória Guimarães.

On 10 January 2013, after nine years playing in Europe, Defendi was presented by Botafogo, his new side.

On 18 February 2015, Defendi signed a two-year contract with Chinese Super League side Shijiazhuang Ever Bright.

On 27 January 2016, he signed for Maribor in the Slovenian PrvaLiga.

Honours
Roma
Coppa Italia: 2006–07

Vitória de Guimarães
Taça de Portugal: 2012–13

Botafogo
 Campeonato Carioca: 2013

Maribor
Slovenian Championship (1): 2016–17
 Slovenian Cup (1): 2015–16

References

External links
 
 
 

Living people
1986 births
People from Ribeirão Preto
Brazilian footballers
Association football defenders
A.S. Roma players
Tottenham Hotspur F.C. players
Udinese Calcio players
U.S. Avellino 1912 players
Serie A players
Serie B players
Slovenian PrvaLiga players
Brazilian expatriate footballers
Expatriate footballers in Italy
Brazilian expatriate sportspeople in Italy
Vitória S.C. players
Primeira Liga players
Campeonato Brasileiro Série A players
Botafogo de Futebol e Regatas players
Esporte Clube Vitória players
Brazilian expatriate sportspeople in Portugal
Expatriate footballers in Portugal
Expatriate footballers in England
Brazilian expatriate sportspeople in England
Expatriate footballers in China
Brazilian expatriate sportspeople in China
Expatriate footballers in Slovenia
Brazilian expatriate sportspeople in Slovenia
Cangzhou Mighty Lions F.C. players
Chinese Super League players
NK Maribor players
C.D. Aves players
G.D. Estoril Praia players
Liga Portugal 2 players
Footballers from São Paulo (state)